The 2004 Scotland rugby union tour of down under was a series of matches played in May and June 2004 in Australia and New Zealand down under by Scotland national rugby union team.

All the matches were played in Australia, except for the test with Samoa, that was played in Wellington (New Zealand)

Results 

Samoa: 15.Tanner Vili, 14.Lome Fa'atau, 13.Dale Rasmussen, 12.Brian Lima, 11.Sailosi Tagicakibau, 10.Roger Warren, 9.Steve So'oialo, 8.Semo Sititi (capt.), 7.Ulia Ulia, 6.Siaosi Vaili, 5.Opeta Palepoi, 4.Leo Lafaiali'i, 3.Tamato Leupolu, 2.Jonathan Meredith, 1.Kas Lealamanu'a,  – replacements: 17.Simon Lemalu, 18.Kitiona Viliamu, 19.Michael von Dincklage, 20.John Senio, 20.John Senio, 22.David Lemi    –  No entry : 16.Loleni Tafunai, 21.Mussolini Schuster
Scotland: 15.Chris Paterson (capt.), 14.Sean Lamont, 13.Ben Hinshelwood, 12.Andrew Henderson, 11.Simon Webster, 10.Gordon Ross, 9.Chris Cusiter, 8.Ally Hogg, 7.Donnie Macfadyen, 6.Jason White, 5.Stuart Grimes, 4.Scott Murray, 3.Bruce Douglas, 2.Gordon Bulloch, 1.Tom Smith,  – replacements: 16.Steve Scott, 17.Craig Smith, 18.Iain Fullarton, 19.Jon Petrie, 20.Mike Blair, 21.Dan Parks, 22.Hugo Southwell 

Australia: 15.Joe Roff, 14.Wendell Sailor, 13.Clyde Rathbone, 12.Matt Giteau, 11.Lote Tuqiri, 10.Stephen Larkham, 9.George Gregan (capt), 8.David Lyons, 7.George Smith, 6.Radike Samo, 5.Nathan Sharpe, 4.Justin Harrison, 3.Al Baxter, 2.Brendan Cannon, 1.Bill Young,  – replacements: 16.Jeremy Paul, 17.Matt Dunning, 18.Dan Vickerman, 19.Phil Waugh, 20.Morgan Turinui, 21.Matt Burke, 22.Chris Latham 
Scotland: 15.Hugo Southwell, 14.Sean Lamont, 13.Ben Hinshelwood, 12.Andrew Henderson, 11.Simon Webster, 10.Dan Parks, 9.Chris Cusiter, 8.Ally Hogg, 7.Donnie Macfadyen, 6.Jason White, 5.Stuart Grimes, 4.Scott Murray (capt), 3.Bruce Douglas, 2.Gordon Bulloch, 1.Tom Smith,  – replacements: 16.Steve Scott, 17.Craig Smith, 18.Iain Fullarton, 19.Jon Petrie, 20.Mike Blair, 21.Gordon Ross, 22.Graeme Morrison 

Australia: 15.Joe Roff, 14.Wendell Sailor, 13.Stirling Mortlock, 12.Morgan Turinui, 11.Lote Tuqiri, 10.Stephen Larkham, 9.George Gregan (capt), 8.David Lyons, 7.Phil Waugh, 6.Radike Samo, 5.Nathan Sharpe, 4.Justin Harrison, 3.Al Baxter, 2.Brendan Cannon, 1.Bill Young,  – replacements: 16.Jeremy Paul, 17.Matt Dunning, 18.Dan Vickerman, 19.George Smith, 21.Clyde Rathbone, 22.Chris Latham    –  No entry : 20.Matt Henjak
Scotland: 15.Hugo Southwell, 14.Sean Lamont, 13.Ben Hinshelwood, 12.Andrew Henderson, 11.Simon Webster, 10.Dan Parks, 9.Chris Cusiter, 8.Ally Hogg, 7.Donnie Macfadyen, 6.Jason White, 5.Iain Fullarton, 4.Scott Murray (capt), 3.Bruce Douglas, 2.Gordon Bulloch, 1.Tom Smith,  – replacements: 17.Craig Smith, 18.Craig Hamilton, 19.Jon Petrie, 19.Jon Petrie, 21.Gordon Ross, 22.Graeme Morrison    –  No entry: 16.Steve Scott, 20.Mike Blair

References 
 
 
 
 
 
 

2004 rugby union tours
tour
2004
2004 in Australian rugby union
2004 in Oceanian rugby union
2004 in Samoan sport
2004
History of rugby union matches between Australia and Scotland